Single-line may refer to:

 Inflatable single-line kite, one of the few modern inventions in the world of kite design
 Single-line diagram, a simplified notation for representing a three-phase power system in power engineering
 Single-line working, the practice of using one track out of two on a double track railway
 Single-track railway

See also

 Single yellow line